Semanur Akbaş (born January 1, 1996, in Osmangazi, Bursa, Turkey) is a Turkish women's football striker currently playing in the Turkish Women's Third Football League for Konyaaltı Gençlik ve Spor with jersey number 9.

Playing career

Club
She received her license on May 30, 2008, for her hometown club Bursa Sağlıkgücü Gençlikspor. Akbaş played two seasons, capped 24 times and scored three goals for her team in the Turkish Women's Second Football League. In the 2011–12 season, she transferred to Derince Belediyespor. At the end of the season, she enjoyed her team's promotion to the Women's First League.

After withdrawal of Derince Belediyespor from the league, Akbaş moved to Second League team 1207 Antalya Muratpaşa Belediye spor for the 2014–15 season. At the end of the season, her team became league champion, and was promoted to the Women's First League again.

In the second half of the 2017–18 First league season, she moved to Konyaaltı Gençli ve Spor in Antalya to play in the Turkish Third League.

International
Semanur Akbaş appeared twice in the TurKey girls' national U-15 team and capped 6 times for the Turkey U-17 netting one goal. Currently, she is a member of the Turkey U-19 team.

She was called up to the Turkey women's U-21 team for the match against Belgium on November 26, 2014.

Career statistics

Honours
 Turkish Women's First League
 Derince Belediyespor
 Third places (1): 2013–14.

Turkish Women's Second League
 1207 Antalya Muratpaşa Belediye Spor
 Winners (1): 2014–15

References

External links

Living people
1996 births
People from Osmangazi
Turkish women's footballers
Turkey women's international footballers
Derince Belediyespor women's players
1207 Antalya Spor players
Women's association football forwards
Trabzon İdmanocağı women's players